Fluazacort (brand name Azacortid) is a synthetic glucocorticoid corticosteroid which is marketed in Italy.

References

Acetate esters
Cyclohexanols
Corticosteroid esters
Fluoroarenes
Glucocorticoids
Oxazolines
Pregnanes
Triketones